Tetragnatha virescens is a species of spider of the genus Tetragnatha. It is found in Bangladesh, Sri Lanka to Indonesia, and Philippines. The species is more commonly found during the early vegetative growth stage of the rice plant, where they are important predators. Male is about 5.9 to 7.8 mm in length without chelicerae. Anterior row of eyes occupying the full width of carapace. Maxilla are nearly parallel. All legs with spines and hair. Female is larger than male, usually about 6.55 to 8.25 mm in length. Body is light green in color, which is suitable for the survival among paddy leaves.

See also
 List of Tetragnathidae species

References

Tetragnathidae
Endemic fauna of Sri Lanka
Spiders of Asia
Spiders described in 1979